Phantom were South Korean hip hop boy band consisting of three members: Kiggen, Sanchez and Hanhae. They were managed by Brand New Music and Rainbow Bridge World. The group released numerous single albums and two mini-albums: Phantom City and Phantom Theory. In 2014, the group released its first full-length album, Phantom Power. Phantom disbanded in 2017.

Career

Beginnings and YouTube covers

Kiggen began his career as an underground producer and composer. He released his first solo album, a hip-hop and jazz hybrid called Pianissimo, in 2007. That same year, he started an electronic music project called HybRefine. The group's only album, 2010, was released in 2010 and featured Sanchez on the single, "Cosmo Dance." Hanhae was a trainee under Stardom Entertainment and an original member of k-pop group Block B. He left the group before its debut and released his own mixtape, Eargasm, in 2011.

After joining Brand New Music, all three artists appeared in the music video for label mate Verbal Jint's single, "You Look Good," in 2011. As Phantom, they released several videos that year on YouTube, including "19 Song," a medley of songs that had been banned by the South Korean Ministry of Gender Equality and Family, and "Freddie 'Phantom' Mercury Singing The Boys", which featured Sanchez emulating Queen's lead singer Freddie Mercury while singing the song "The Boys" by girl group Girls' Generation.

Hole In Your Face and Rookie of the Month award 
On 25 November 2011, Phantom released their first single album, Hole In Your Face (얼굴 뚫어지겠다). The music video teaser was released the same day on their official YouTube channel. The video, which depicted a girl being shot in the head by a gun, was immediately controversial due to its graphic nature, and the group released a censored version soon after.

Phantom was awarded "Rookie of the Month" at the Cyworld Digital Music Awards for December 2011, despite the fact that the group hadn't yet made its official debut. However, they made many performances over the next few months, appearing alongside popular artists including Verbal Jint, Bizniz, Swings, and Mighty Mouth. The group also appeared in music videos by Verbal Jint, Absalute Music, and Skull.

Phantom City and Phantom Theory
In August 2012, Phantom released the ballad, "Seaweed Soup". They followed up with their first mini-album, Phantom City, a few days later, reaching #10 on the Gaon Album Chart. Phantom made their music show debut with the album track, "Burning," which they performed on M! Countdown, Music Bank, Music Core, and Inkigayo. The group won Best New Artist at the Korean Culture Entertainment Awards that year.

In January 2013, Phantom released their second mini-album, Phantom Theory, which debuted at #12 on the Gaon Album Chart. They also released a music video for the single "Like Cho Young Pil."

Phantom Power 
Phantom released their first full-length album, Phantom Power, in May 2014. The album featured guest artists San E, Verbal Jint, Navi, and Ga In, the last of whom featured on title track, "Seoul Lonely." The album debuted at #16 on the Gaon Album Chart.

Discography

Studio albums

Extended plays

Singles

As lead artist

Collaborations

Awards

References

 

South Korean hip hop groups
Brand New Music artists
South Korean musical trios
Musical groups established in 2011
Musical groups disestablished in 2017
2011 establishments in South Korea